Soo-hee, also spelled Su-hui, is a Korean unisex given name.  Its meaning depends on the hanja used to write each syllable of the name. There are 67 hanja with the reading "soo" and 24 hanja with the reading "hee" on the South Korean government's official list of hanja which may be registered for use in given names.

People with this name include:
Kim Soo-hee (born 1953), South Korean female singer
Go Soo-hee (born 1976), South Korean actress  
Roh Su-hui, South Korean male political activist arrested for breaking the National Security Act

Fictional characters with this name include:
Su-hee, in 2006 South Korean film Gangster High
Chung Soo-hee, in 2006 South Korean television series Goodbye Solo
Oh Soo-hee, in 2008 South Korean film Forever the Moment
Jung Soo-hee, in 2009 South Korean television series Good Job, Good Job
Choi Soo-hee, in 2009 South Korean television series My Too Perfect Sons
Han Soo-hee, in 2010 South Korean television series Definitely Neighbors
Kim Soo-hee, in 2010 South Korean television series Road No. 1
Jin Soo-hee, in 2013 South Korean television series Two Women's Room

See also
List of Korean given names

References

Korean unisex given names